Dr. Benjamin Hayes Dougan (June 22, 1867 - January 1, 1940) was a Canadian physician and politician in the Province of New Brunswick. Known by his middle name, in the 1901 Canadian census, he is listed as Hazen Dugan. At census time, he was at his future in-laws home in Gagetown, New Brunswick. In 1906, he married Blanch M. Slipp (1878–1959).

Dougan became a medical doctor and he and his wife made their home in Harvey Station, New Brunswick. In 1924, he gained wide recognition as the Province's coroner who conducted the inquiry into the sensational shooting deaths of two young female siblings in Fosterville, New Brunswick. Capitalizing on his celebrity following the January 1925 trial and conviction of Darius H. Thornton for the double murders, in the August provincial election Dougan was elected to the Legislative Assembly of New Brunswick as the Conservative Party candidate in the multiple-member riding of New Brunswick. He was reelected in 1930 and served until June 27, 1939.

Benjamin Hayes Dougan died in 1940. He and his wife are buried in the Fredericton Rural Cemetery.

1867 births
1940 deaths
Physicians from New Brunswick
People from York County, New Brunswick
Progressive Conservative Party of New Brunswick MLAs
Canadian coroners